A rag doll is a toy.

Rag doll or Ragdoll may also refer to:

Music 
 "Rag Doll" (Aerosmith song)
 "Rag Doll" (The Four Seasons song)
 "Ragdoll", a song by Maroon 5 from Songs About Jane
 "Ragdoll", a song by Ashlee Simpson from Bittersweet World
 "Ragdoll", a song by David Geraghty from Kill Your Darlings
 "Ragdoll", a song by Lucy Woodward from Hooked!
 Rag Doll, a 1990s American band featuring Rod Jackson (musician)
 "Rag Doll", a song by Art Garfunkel from Breakaway

Other uses 
 Ragdoll, a breed of cats
 Rag Doll (comics), a fictional character in the DC Comics universe
 Rag Doll (Peter Merkel Jr.), a DC Comics character, son of the above
 Ragdoll (film), a 1999 film by Ted Nicolaou
 Rag Doll (film), a 1961 British B-movie crime film
 Ragdoll (TV series), a TV series
 Ragdoll physics, a video game physics model
 Ragdoll Productions, a British producer of television programmes for children

See also 
 The Raggy Dolls, a British cartoon series